Chaetodiadema granulatum is a species of sea urchins of the Family Diadematidae. Their armour is covered with long and slender spines, and the test is quite flattened. 

Chaetodiadema granulatum was first scientifically described in 1903 by Ole Theodor Jensen Mortensen.

See also 

 Ceratophysa rosea
 Chaetodiadema africanum
 Chaetodiadema japonicum

References 

Animals described in 1903
Diadematidae
Taxa named by Ole Theodor Jensen Mortensen